The following is an alphabetical list of articles related to the U.S. State of New York.

0–9 

.ny.us – Internet second-level domain for the state of New York
11th State to ratify the United States Constitution

A
Adjacent states and provinces:

Agriculture in New York
Airports in New York
Albany, New York, state capital since 1797
Alcohol laws of New York
Amusement parks in New York (state)
Aquaria in New York (state)
commons:Category:Aquaria in New York
Arboreta in New York (state)
commons:Category:Arboreta in New York
Archaeology of New York
:Category:Archaeological sites in New York (state)
commons:Category:Archaeological sites in New York
Architecture of New York
Art museums and galleries in New York (state)
commons:Category:Art museums and galleries in New York
Area codes in New York
Astronomical observatories in New York (state)
commons:Category:Astronomical observatories in New York
Attorney General of the State of New York

B
Beaches of New York (state)
commons:Category:Beaches of New York
Belmont Park
Belmont Stakes
Binghamton, NY
Botanical gardens in New York (state)
commons:Category:Botanical gardens in New York
Buffalo, New York
Buildings and structures in New York (state)
commons:Category:Buildings and structures in New York

C

Capital of the State of New York
Capitol of the State of New York
commons:Category:New York State Capitol
Casinos in New York (state)
Caves of New York (state)
commons:Category:Caves of New York
Census statistical areas of New York
Cities in New York
commons:Category:Cities in New York
Climate of New York
Colleges and universities in New York
commons:Category:Universities and colleges in New York
Communications in New York (state)
commons:Category:Communications in New York
Companies in New York
:Category:Companies based in New York (state)
Congressional districts of New York
Constitution of the State of New York
Convention centers in New York (state)
commons:Category:Convention centers in New York
Counties of the State of New York
commons:Category:Counties in New York
County highway routes in New York
Crime in New York
Culture of New York
commons:Category:New York culture

D
Demographics of New York
:Category:Demographics of New York (state)

E
Economy of New York
:Category:Economy of New York (state)
commons:Category:Economy of New York
Education in New York
:Category:Education in New York (state)
commons:Category:Education in New York
Eimatai Leadership Development Project
Elections in the State of New York
:Category:New York (state) elections
commons:Category:New York elections
Environment of New York (state)
commons:Category:Environment of New York

F
Fildwith Ensemble Theatre

Festivals in New York (state)
commons:Category:Festivals in New York (state)
Finger Lakes
Flag of the State of New York
Forts in New York
Fort Amsterdam, capital of Nieuw-Nederland 1625-1664
:Category:Forts in New York (state)
commons:Category:Forts in New York

G

Gardens in New York (state)
commons:Category:Gardens in New York
Genesee Valley Regional Market Authority
Geography of New York
:Category:Geography of New York (state)
commons:Category:Geography of New York
Geology of New York (state)
commons:Category:Geology of New York
German Reform Movement (New York City, 1800s)
Ghost towns in New York
:Category:Ghost towns in New York (state)
commons:Category:Ghost towns in New York
Golf clubs and courses in New York (state)
Government of the State of New York  website
:Category:Government of New York (state)
commons:Category:Government of New York
Governor of the State of New York
List of governors of New York
Great Seal of the State of New York

H
Heritage railroads in New York (state)
commons:Category:Heritage railroads in New York
High schools of New York
Higher education in New York
Highway routes in New York
Hiking trails in New York (state)
commons:Category:Hiking trails in New York
History of New York
Historical outline of New York
Hospitals in New York
Hudson River
Hurley, New York, state capital 1777

I
Images of New York (state)
commons:Category:New York
Interstate highway routes in New York
Islands of New York

J
Joseph T St Lawrence Center

K
Kingston, New York, state capital 1777

L
Lakes in New York
Finger Lakes
Lake Champlain
Lake Erie
Lake Ontario
:Category:Lakes of New York (state)
commons:Category:Lakes of New York
Landmarks in New York (state)
commons:Category:Landmarks in New York
Lieutenant Governor of the State of New York
Lists related to the State of New York:
List of airports in New York
List of census-designated places in New York
List of census statistical areas in New York
List of cities in New York
List of colleges and universities in New York
List of companies in New York
List of counties in New York
List of county highway routes in New York
List of films set in New York City
List of forts in New York
List of ghost towns in New York
List of governors of New York
List of high schools in New York
List of highway routes in New York
List of hospitals in New York
List of individuals executed in New York
List of Interstate highway routes in New York
List of islands of New York
List of lakes in New York
List of law enforcement agencies in New York
List of museums in New York
List of National Historic Landmarks in New York
List of newspapers in New York
List of people from New York
List of places in New York
List of radio stations in New York
List of railroads in New York
List of Registered Historic Places in New York
List of rivers of New York
List of school districts in New York
List of sister cities in New York
List of state forests in New York
List of state highway routes in New York
List of state reference routes and parkway routes in New York
List of state parks in New York
List of state prisons in New York
List of symbols of the State of New York
List of telephone area codes in New York
List of television stations in New York
List of towns in New York
List of United States congressional delegations from New York
List of United States congressional districts in New York
List of United States representatives from New York
List of United States senators from New York
List of U.S. highway routes in New York

M
Maps of New York (state)
commons:Category:Maps of New York
Mass media in New York
Monuments and memorials in New York (state)
commons:Category:Monuments and memorials in New York
Mountains of New York
commons:Category:Mountains of New York
Museums in New York
:Category:Museums in New York (state)
commons:Category:Museums in New York
Music of New York
commons:Category:Music of New York
:Category:Musical groups from New York (state)
:Category:Musicians from New York (state)

N
National Forests of New York (state)
commons:Category:National Forests of New York
Natural history of New York (state)
commons:Category:Natural history of New York
Nature centers in New York (state)
commons:Category:Nature centers in New York
New York  website
:Category:New York (state)
commons:Category:New York
commons:Category:Maps of New York
New York Area Theological Library Association
New York Bill of Rights
New York City AIDS Memorial
New York City Employment and Training Coalition
New York City Science and Engineering Fair
New York City tugboat strike of 1946
New-York later New York City; colonial capital 1664–1673, 1674–1688, and 1689–1776; state capital 1776-1777 and 1788–1797; national capital 1785-1788 and 1789–1790
New York International Arbitration Center (NYIAC)
New York-Newark-Bridgeport, NY-NJ-CT-PA Combined Statistical Area
New York-Northern New Jersey-Long Island, NY-NJ-PA Metropolitan Statistical Area
New York Philanthropic Advisory Service
New York Policy Forum
New York Smash
New York State Capitol
New York State Dental Foundation
New York State Office for the Prevention of Domestic Violence
New York State Thruway
Newspapers of New York
Niagara Falls
Nieuw-Amsterdam, capital of Nieuw-Nederland 1625-1652
Nieuw-Nederland, 1625–1664 and 1673–1674
Nieuw-Oranje, capital of Nieuw-Nederland 1673-1674
NY – United States Postal Service postal code for the State of New York

O
Outdoor sculptures in New York (state)
commons:Category:Outdoor sculptures in New York

P
People from New York
:Category:People from New York (state)
commons:Category:People from New York
:Category:People by city in New York (state)
:Category:People by county in New York (state)
:Category:People from New York (state) by occupation
Places in New York
Politics of New York
:Category:Politics of New York (state)
commons:Category:Politics of New York
Protected areas of New York (state)
commons:Category:Protected areas of New York
Province of New-York, 1664–1673, 1674–1688, 1689–1776
Poughkeepsie, New York, state capital 1777-1788

Q
Queens (borough)

R
Radio stations in New York
Railroad museums in New York (state)
commons:Category:Railroad museums in New York
Railroads in New York
Registered historic places in New York
commons:Category:Registered Historic Places in New York
Religion in New York
:Category:Religion in New York (state)
commons:Category:Religion in New York
Rivers of New York
commons:Category:Rivers of New York
Rock formations in New York (state)
commons:Category:Rock formations in New York
Roller coasters in New York (state)
commons:Category:Roller coasters in New York

S
School districts of New York
Scouting in New York
Populated places in New York (state)
Cities in New York (state)
Towns in New York (state)
Villages in New York (state)
Census Designated Places in New York (state)
Other unincorporated communities in New York (state)
List of ghost towns in New York
List of places in New York
Sister cities in New York
Ski areas and resorts in New York (state)
commons:Category:Ski areas and resorts in New York
Sports in New York
:Category:Sports in New York (state)
commons:Category:Sports in New York
:Category:Sports venues in New York (state)
commons:Category:Sports venues in New York
State Assembly of New York
State Capitol of New York
State highway routes in New York
State of New York
Constitution of the State of New York
Government of the State of New York
:Category:Government of New York (state)
commons:Category:Government of New York
Executive branch of the government of the State of New York
Governor of the State of New York
Legislative branch of the government of the State of New York
Legislature of the State of New York
State Senate of New York
State Assembly of New York
Judicial branch of the government of the State of New York
Supreme Court of the State of New York
State parks of New York
commons:Category:State parks of New York
State parkway routes in New York
State prisons of New York
State reference routes in New York
State Senate of New York
Structures in New York (state)
commons:Category:Buildings and structures in New York
Superfund sites in New York
Supreme Court of the State of New York
Susquehanna River
Symbols of the State of New York
:Category:Symbols of New York (state)
commons:Category:Symbols of New York

T
Telecommunications in New York (state)
commons:Category:Communications in New York
Telephone area codes in New York
Television shows set in New York (state)
Television stations in New York
Theatres in New York (state)
commons:Category:Theatres in New York
Tourism in New York (state)  website
commons:Category:Tourism in New York
Towns in New York
commons:Category:Cities in New York
Transportation in New York
:Category:Transportation in New York (state)
commons:Category:Transport in New York
Triple Crown of Thoroughbred Racing

U
United States of America
States of the United States of America
United States census statistical areas of New York
United States congressional delegations from New York
United States congressional districts in New York
United States Court of Appeals for the Second Circuit
United States District Court for the Eastern District of New York
United States District Court for the Northern District of New York
United States District Court for the Southern District of New York
United States District Court for the Western District of New York
United States representatives from New York
United States senators from New York
Universities and colleges in New York
commons:Category:Universities and colleges in New York
Upstate New York
U.S. highway routes in New York
US-NY – ISO 3166-2:US region code for the State of New York

V

W
Water parks in New York (state)
Waterfalls of New York (state)
commons:Category:Waterfalls of New York
Wikimedia
Wikimedia Commons:Category:New York
commons:Category:Maps of New York
Wikinews:Category:New York
Wikinews:Portal:New York
Wikipedia Category:New York
Wikipedia Portal:New York (state)
Wikipedia:WikiProject New York (state)
Wikipedia:WikiProject New York (state)#Articles
Wikipedia:WikiProject New York (state)#Members

X

Y

Z
Zoos in New York (state)
commons:Category:Zoos in New York

See also

Topic overview:
New York
Outline of New York

Bibliography of New York

New York (state)
 
New York